The Spion Kop Battlefield, graves and memorials are maintained by Heritage KZN. The battlefield was proclaimed as a  heritage landmark in 1978. The site is open to the public and an overview of the battle as well as a map of the battlefield is available at the entrance gate.

Memorials

Boer memorial 

A stone memorial with four faces erected by the Second Field Force Battalion in remembrance of all Boer Officers and Burghers that died on Spion Kop.

British memorial 

This stone memorial has 6 faces dedicated to
 Thorneycrofts Mounted Infantry
 2nd Battalion, The Kings Own Royal Lancaster Regiment
 Major General Sir Edward Woodgate, the 17th Field Company Royal Engineers, Natal Volunteer Ambulance Corps
 Lancashire Fusiliers
 Scottish Rifles
 Middlesex Regiment

Imperial Light Infantry memorial

Other 

 South Lancasters memorial 
 Two mass graves
 A number of individual graves and memorials, including that of Major General Sir Edward Woodgate.

Memorials in planning 
 Spionkop Lodge, located on the farmstead that Redvers Buller used as headquarters before the Battle of Spion Kop, has recently announced plans to erect a new memorial in remembrance to the Natal Volunteer Ambulance Corps. It is expected that the monument will be unveiled in 2010 with the 110th anniversary of the Battle of Spion Kop.

Events 
 The Liverpool supporters club of South Africa commemorates the Hillsborough Disaster on top of Spion Kop every year since 2007.

See also 
 Battle of Spion Kop

References 

http://www.liverpoolfc.com/news/latest-news/south-african-reds-to-hold-memorial

External links 

 Spion Kop at Heritage KZN
 Canadian Anglo Boer War Museum

Second Boer War memorials